Somsara may refer to:
 Somsara-ye Olya
 Somsara-ye Sofla